Eurasia, also known as Steel Peak, is a  supertall skyscraper located on plot 12 of the MIBC in Moscow, Russia. It is the sixth-tallest building in Russia, the seventh-tallest building in Europe, and the 72nd-tallest building in the world. Construction of Eurasia started in 2006 and was completed in 2014.

History 
The concept of Eurasia was first proposed in 2003. Construction started in 2006 and was completed in 2014.

Design 
According to Swanke Hayden Connell Architects, the architectural skin of Eurasia reinforces the purity of the tower volume over the complexity of the program within. The unitized curtain wall allows the transition from the office floors of fixed windows to operable windows on the residential floors. The overall architectural form is developed as a pure glass, curving, curtain wall tower with its broad faces versus its tripartite ends sitting on a multi-volume podium.

Eurasia was the first composite structure to be constructed in Russia utilizing a reinforced concrete core with a perimeter frame of steel. The structural design allows for column-free interior spaces ideal for offices which make up a significant portion of the building’s programming. The building features a bowed exterior made up of closely spaced steel columns which sit upon a belt truss serving as a load transfer for the base of the tower to feature an open lobby on the ground floor.

Features 
The building is designed as a two-tier skyscraper: 30 floors in the first tier and 37 in the second one. Offices occupy from the 4th floor to the 45th floor while apartments occupy from the 48th floor to the 66th floor. The 47th floor is occupied by a fitness center and the second floor of the building is occupied by a casino. A swimming pool is located on the 50th floor.

Management
The building is developed by CJSC Techinvest and MOS City Group. The company LLC Plaza owns Eurasia. On 12 April 2016, VB-service, a subsidiary of VTB Bank, acquired a 99.55% stake in LLC Plaza at a price estimated at 48.5 billion rubles. The transaction was carried out within the framework of the fulfillment of credit obligations by Coulteria to the Bank of Moscow. Head offices of VTB 24 and the Bank of Moscow are planned to occupy the tower.

Construction gallery

Awards 

 The Eurasia Tower is the second Swanke-designed building rated by Emporis.
 It also rated by Turkish banking company Is Bankasi as among the top ten innovative and imposing designs of notable bank buildings around the world. This in turn led Swanke to meet up with its Turkish manager and associate architect Summa International Construction Inc.

See also
List of tallest buildings in Russia
List of tallest buildings in Europe

References

External links

 

Moscow International Business Center
Skyscraper office buildings in Moscow